Clear Creek AME Church, also known as Clear Creek School, is a historic African Methodist Episcopal church located about  south of Felixville, Louisiana.

The modest wood building dates back to an uncertain period between c.1915 and c.1925, and, as was typical in Louisiana, served also as a school. The congregation was founded in 1865, and the land upon which the church was built was donated in 1872 by Miss Margaret Collingsworth and Mrs. M. E. Hodges for "church and school purposes". It is not known exactly when the building ceased to be used as a school, while AME services continued to be held in the building until 1998.

The building was added to the National Register of Historic Places on March 28, 2002.

See also
National Register of Historic Places listings in East Feliciana Parish, Louisiana

References

Methodist churches in Louisiana
Churches on the National Register of Historic Places in Louisiana
Churches in East Feliciana Parish, Louisiana
School buildings on the National Register of Historic Places in Louisiana
National Register of Historic Places in East Feliciana Parish, Louisiana